Dawid  Kostecki (27 June 1981 – 2 August 2019) was a Polish professional boxer who fought at light heavyweight.

Personal life

Kostecki was born in Rzeszów, Poland. He married Edyta and they had four children.

Boxing titles 
WBC Youth Light Heavyweight Title (2004)
WBF Light Heavyweight Title (2005)
IBC Light Heavyweight Title (2010)
(2) WBF Light Heavyweight Title (2010)
WBC Baltic Light Heavyweight Title (2010)
WBA Inter-Continental Light Heavyweight Title (2011)

Scheduled bout against Roy Jones Jr.

Dawid Kostecki is best remembered in boxing circles for a scheduled bout which never took place. In a major opportunity bout which could have propelled Kostecki into the worldwide light heavyweight ratings, Roy Jones was supposed to face Kostecki in a 10 round bout at Atlas Arena on 30 June 2012. Days before the fight, Kostecki was convicted of being the ringleader of a criminal organization and was imprisoned. Another Polish boxer, Paweł Głażewski stepped in to fight Jones instead. Jones defeated the 17-0 Głażewski by 10 round split decision. Kostecki missed the career change of a lifetime by now being able to fight the legendary ex-world champion Jones, who had signed for the bout, who showed up in Poland contractually anyway, and who fought a different Polish contender instead.

Escort business and prison
On 31 October 2011, the District Court in Rzeszów sentenced Kostecki to 2.5 years in prison for setting up and co-owning a criminal group. From 2003 to 2007 the group conducted three escort agencies. Investigators also accused him of trafficking in amphetamine, but the court acquitted him of the charge. He lodged an appeal. On 10 May 2012 the Court of Appeal upheld the judgment of 2.5 years imprisonment. On 13 August 2014, he was released from prison early. He was subsequently returned to prison again in Warsaw in 2016 for five years after his fifth conviction, for drug trafficking, car theft, running a prostitution escort ring, and income tax evasion.

Comeback to ring
After emerging from prison in 2014, Kostecki extended his contract by four years with Andrzej Wasilewski, owner of the Poland's Knockout Promotions. Kostecki's comeback attempt ended in failure as he lost an eight round decision to Andrzej Soldra in Krakow Arena in Krakow Poland on 8 November 2014. Kostecki never fought again, finishing with a pro record of 39-2 with 25 knockouts.

Death
Kostecki committed suicide by hanging in a Warsaw prison using bedsheets on 2 August 2019. He was survived by his wife and children.

Professional record

|-
|align="center" colspan=8|39 Wins (25 knockouts), 2 Loss, 0 Draw
|-
|align=center style="border-style: none none solid solid; background: #e3e3e3"|Result
|align=center style="border-style: none none solid solid; background: #e3e3e3"|Record
|align=center style="border-style: none none solid solid; background: #e3e3e3"|Opponent
|align=center style="border-style: none none solid solid; background: #e3e3e3"|Type
|align=center style="border-style: none none solid solid; background: #e3e3e3"|Round
|align=center style="border-style: none none solid solid; background: #e3e3e3"|Date
|align=center style="border-style: none none solid solid; background: #e3e3e3"|Location
|align=center style="border-style: none none solid solid; background: #e3e3e3"|Notes
|-align=center
|- align=center
|Loss
|39-2
|align=left| Andrzej Sołdra
|UD || 8
|2014-11-08 || align=left| Kraków
|align=left|
|- align=center
|-align=center
|Win
|39–1
|align=left| Sandro Siproshvili
| UD || 6
|2012-04-21 || align=left| Zabrze
|align=left|
|-align=center
|Win
|38–1
|align=left| Byron Mitchell
| KO || 4 
|2011-12-03 || align=left| Warszawa
|align=left|
|-align=center
|Win
|37–1
|align=left| Lolenga Mock
| UD || 10
|2011-06-25 || align=left| Rzeszów
|align=left|
|-align=center
|Win
|36–1
|align=left| Juan Nelongo
| UD || 6
|2011-03-05 || align=left| Krynica Zdrój
|align=left|
|-align=center
|Win
|35–1
|align=left| Shawn Corbin
| TKO || 4 
|2010-10-23 || align=left| Warszawa
|align=left|
|-align=center
|Win
|34–1
|align=left| Giulian Ilie
| UD || 12
|2010-04-24 || align=left| Gdynia
|align=left|
|-align=center
|Win
|33–1
|align=left| Dario Cichello
| TKO || 7 
|2010-02-06 || align=left| Rzeszów
|align=left|
|-align=center
|Win
|32–1
|align=left| Istvan Varga
| TKO || 1 
|2009-12-18 || align=left| Łódź
|align=left|
|-align=center
|Win
|31–1
|align=left| Grzegorz Soszyński
| UD ||10
|2009-10-24 || align=left| Łódź
|align=left|
|-align=center
|Win
|30–1
|align=left| Martial Bella Oleme
| UD ||8
|2009-02-28 || align=left| Lublin
|align=left|
|-align=center
|Win
|29–1
|align=left| Samson Onyango
| TKO || 5 
|2008-12-13 || align=left| Ketrzyn
|align=left|
|-align=center
|Win
|28–1
|align=left| Marcelo Leandro Da Silva
| TKO || 1 
|2008-09-14 || align=left| Kielce
|align=left|
|-align=center
|Win
|27–1
|align=left| Armen Azizian
| UD || 8
|2008-02-29 || align=left| Lublin
|align=left|
|-align=center
|Win
|26–1
|align=left| Antonio Pedro Quiganga
| TKO || 2 
|2007-12-15 || align=left| Rzeszów
|align=left|
|-align=center
|Win
|25–1
|align=left| Bernard Donfack
| UD || 8
|2007-10-13 || align=left| Moscow
|align=left|
|-align=center
|Win
|24–1
|align=left| Paul David
| KO || 1 
|2007-09-22 || align=left| Bytom
|align=left|
|-align=center
|Win
|23–1
|align=left| Ramdane Serdjane
| DQ || 6 
|2006-10-28 || align=left| Dębica
|align=left|
|-align=center
|Win
|22–1
|align=left| Andreas Günther
| KO || 2 
|2006-07-01 || align=left| Kepno
|align=left|
|-align=center
|Loss
|21–1
|align=left| Rachid Kanfouah
| KO || 9 
|2006-05-06 || align=left| Krosno
|align=left|
|-align=center
|Win
|21–0
|align=left| Richard Nwoba 	 
| KO || 2 
|2006-01-21 || align=left| Busko Zdrój
|align=left|
|-align=center
|Win
|20–0
|align=left| Ismail Abdoul	
| UD || 12
|2005-10-15 || align=left| Rzeszów
|align=left|
|-align=center
|Win
|19–0
|align=left| Joseph Marwa
| TKO || 5 
|2005-05-21 || align=left| Zdzieszowice
|align=left|
|-align=center
|Win
|18–0
|align=left| Mukadi Shambuyi
| KO || 3 
|2005-03-12 || align=left| Poznań
|align=left|
|-align=center
|Win
|17–0
|align=left| Tucker Lambert
| KO || 3 
|2005-01-21 || align=left| Elk Grove
|align=left|
|-align=center
|Win
|16–0
|align=left| Dhafir Smith
| UD || 10
|2004-12-19 || align=left| Rzeszów
|align=left|
|-align=center
|Win
|15–0
|align=left| Talal Santiago
| PTS || 6 
|2004-11-20 || align=left| Strzelce Opolskie
|align=left|
|-align=center
|Win
|14–0
|align=left| Gasper Mathew
| TKO || 5 
|2004-09-25 || align=left| Opole
|align=left|
|-align=center
|Win
|13–0
|align=left| Dmitry Treskov	
| TKO || 6 
|2004-06-05 || align=left| Dąbrowa Górnicza
|align=left|
|-align=center
|Win
|12–0
|align=left| Ivica Cukusic
| KO || 2 
|2004-04-24 || align=left| Dąbrowa Górnicza
|align=left|
|-align=center
|Win
|11–0
|align=left| George Adipo Odour
| TKO || 6 
|2004-03-27 || align=left| Radom
|align=left| 
|-align=center
|Win
|10–0
|align=left| Stefan Stanko
| KO || 1 
|2004-03-13 || align=left| Berlin
|align=left|
|-align=center
|Win
|9–0
|align=left| Pavel Zima
| TKO || 3 
|2003-12-13 || align=left| Opole
|align=left|
|-align=center
|Win
|8–0
|align=left| Otto Nemeth
| TKO || 2 
|2003-10-24 || align=left| Wrocław
|align=left|
|-align=center
|Win
|7–0
|align=left| Bruce Özbek
| PTS || 6
|2003-09-27 || align=left| Gorzów Wielkopolski
|align=left|
|-align=center
|Win
|6–0
|align=left| Florian Benche
| PTS || 4 
|2003-06-28 || align=left| Opole
|align=left|
|-align=center
|Win
|5–0
|align=left| Dmitry Adamovich
| KO || 3 
|2002-05-24 || align=left| Płońsk
|align=left|
|-align=center
|Win
|4–0
|align=left| Sandor Szakaly
| TKO || 1 
|2002-04-13 || align=left| Bielsko Biała
|align=left|
|-align=center
|Win
|3–0
|align=left| Piotr Ścieszka
| TKO || 2 
|2002-02-23 || align=left| Włocławek
|align=left|
|-align=center
|Win
|2–0
|align=left| unknown
| KO || 2 
|2001-12-29 || align=left| Konin
|align=left|
|-align=center
|Win
|1–0
|align=left| Marcin Najman
| TKO || 4 
|2001-11-24 || align=left| Łódź
|align=left|
|-align=center

References

1981 births
2019 deaths
Polish Romani people
People from Rzeszów
Romani sportspeople
Place of death missing
Sportspeople from Podkarpackie Voivodeship
Polish male boxers
Suicides by hanging in Poland
Light-heavyweight boxers
2019 suicides
People who committed suicide in prison custody